Joseph or Joe Edwards may refer to:

 Joseph Edwards (sculptor) (1814–1882), Welsh sculptor
 Joseph Edwards Jr. (1737–1783), American silversmith
 Joseph Edwards Carpenter (1813–1885), English playwright and songwriter
 Joseph H. Edwards (1873–1911), American football player and coach
 Joe Edwards (singer/bass player), frontman of The Rascals
 Joe F. Edwards Jr. (born 1958), American astronaut
 Joe Edwards (painter) (1933–2000), Scottish painter
 Joe Edwards (comics) (1921–2007), cartoonist of Lil Jinx in Archie Comics
 Joe Edwards (St. Louis), businessman and community figure from St. Louis, Missouri
 Joe Edwards (footballer, born 1990), English professional footballer
 Joe Edwards (footballer, born 1907) (1907–1997), English footballer
 Joe Edwards (rugby union) (born 1993), New Zealander and Rugby union player
 Joe Edwards (Kansas politician) (1954–2014), American state legislator from Kansas

See also
 Jim Joe Edwards (1894–1965), Major League Baseball pitcher